Kathanayika Molla is a 1970 Indian Telugu-language film directed by comedian Padmanabham. It is based on the life of the poet Molla, played by Vanisree. It features the songs Jagame Ramamayam and Manishini Brahmayya Mattito Chesenaya and received the Nandi Award for Best Feature Film. Songs were written by Dasharathi Krishnamacharya.

Plot
The story is based on life of the poet Molla, who translated the Ramayana from Sanskrit into Telugu.

Credits

Cast
 Vanisree as Molla
 Harinath as Lord Vishnu
 B. Padmanabham as Tenali Ramakrishna
 Tyagaraaju
 Sobhan Babu
 Gummadi as Kesana
 Nagabhushanam   
 Allu Ramalingaiah as Avadhani
 Mikkilineni
 Jyothi Laxmi as Vidhusheemani
 Geethanjali as Ranganayaki
 Kaikala Satyanarayana as Sri Krishna Devaraya (King)

Crew
 Director: B. Padmanabham
 Producer: B. Purushottam
 Production Company: Rekha and Murali Productions
 Original Music: S. P. Kodandapani
 Playback singers: Ghantasala, S. P. Balasubrahmanyam and P. Susheela

Songs
 "Doravo Evaravo Naa Korake Digina Devaravo" (Lyrics: Devulapalli Krishnasastri; Singers: P. Susheela and Ghantasala
 "Jagame Ramamayam Manase Aganita Taraka Namamayam" (Singer: P. Susheela)
 "Manishini Brahmayya Mattito Chesenaya" (Singer: S. P. Balasubrahmanyam)
 "Naane Cheluve Kannadiki" (Singer: L. R. Eswari)
 "Lanka Dahanam" (Singers: Ghantasala and party)
 "Vinduva Veenula Vinduga Govindu Nandallu Parinayamaina Gaadha" (Lyrics: Devulapalli Krishnasastri)

Awards
 Nandi Award for Best Feature Film - Gold - B. Purushottam

References

External links
 Kathanayika Molla at IMDb.
 Kathanayika Molla Film At Basthi.com

1970 films
Indian biographical films
1970s Telugu-language films
1970s biographical films
Films set in the Vijayanagara Empire